Bangalore University (BU) is a public state university located in Bangalore, Karnataka, India. The university is a part of the Association of Indian Universities (AIU), Association of Commonwealth Universities (ACU) and affiliated by University Grants Commission (UGC). Bangalore University is accredited by the NAAC with grade A in 2016 under the new grading system. Bangalore University was trifurcated into Bengaluru City University and Bengaluru North University.

Organisation and administration

Governance 

Dr Jayakar S M is the current Vice Chancellor appointed on 11 July 2022. Dr Cynthia Menezes Prabhu was the temporary Vice-Chancellor during June – July 2022. Dr Venugopal K R. was appointed as the Vice-Chancellor of Bangalore University on 12 June 2018 and his tenure ended on 10 June 2022. Dr. Venugopal K R, UVCE Alumni, Principal UVCE was the Special Officer to the Government of Karnataka for Trifurcating Bangalore University. He submitted the report on 26th March 2015 for restructuring Bangalore University into Bangalore University, Bengaluru City University and Bengaluru North University and UVCE to be carved out as Center of Excellence on the model of Indian Institute of Technology. Former Vice-Chancellor (VC) was Prabhu Dev. He resigned on 13 October 2012 to accept the Karnataka government's offer of chairmanship of the Karnataka Health System Commission. H.N. Ramesh was appointed as VC temporarily till new VC is appointed by the state

With more than 650 affiliated colleges, the Karnataka government has decided to bifurcate, or 'carve out a new university' to ease management. To this effect, the state government had appointed two study groups. One group was headed by former Gulbarga University Vice-Chancellor N Rudraiah and another was a group formed by the Karnataka State Higher Education Council. The Rudraiah study suggested trifurcation of the university, while the Council suggested bifurcation.

Affiliated colleges 
Bangalore University lists 70 government colleges, 52 aided colleges and 11 unaided colleges. Notable affiliated colleges include:

Acharya Institute of Management and Sciences
Bangalore Management Academy
Oxford College of Sciences
St. Claret College, Bangalore
Surana College, Bangalore
University Visvesvaraya College of Engineering

Academics 
The university is structured into six faculties- Arts, Science, Commerce & Management, Education, Law and Engineering. It has 43 Post Graduate Departments, a Postgraduate Centre at Kolar, (Started during 1994–95), three constituent colleges, 665 affiliated colleges (of which 115 have PG Courses) and several other Centres and Directorates of higher learning and research under its purview. At present, the university offers 50 Post Graduate Courses and Employment Oriented Diploma and Certificate Courses. The university has launched the five-year Integrated Courses in Biological Sciences, Social Sciences, Earth and Atmospheric Sciences and Business Studies and four-year B.S. programme.

Ranking 

The QS World University Rankings ranked Bangalore University 351–400 in Asia in 2020. The NIRF ranked it 100th overall and 68th among universities.

Distinctions 

In 2001, the university was accredited by NAAC and received Five Star Status. The university then once again reaccredited under the new grading system with a grade A.

In a first, the university in 2010 announced admissions for transgender people by reserving one seat in each PG course. Now, the University's admission forms feature a third category of gender, namely 'Others'.

Notable alumni 

 H. Narasimhaiah, Vice-chancellor of Bangalore University, Bangalore.
 Venugopal K R Vice-chancellor of Bangalore University, Bangalore.
Abraham V. M, Vice-chancellor of Christ University, Bangalore.
 Sri Sri Ravi Shankar
 Arun Pudur
 Kiran Mazumdar-Shaw
 Sir Mokshagundam Visvesvaraya
 E P Metcalfe
 C. N. S. Iyengar
 T.V. Mohandas Pai
 C. Rajagopalachari
 C. Aswath
 Monisha Unni
 Deepti Divakar
 Vasant Honavar
 Nicole Faria
 Anushka Shetty
 Anushka Sharma
 Anjali Jay
 Ramesh Aravind
 Mano Murthy
 Pooja Umashankar
 V. P. Shetty
 Mamta Mohandas
 K. R. Sreenivasan
 Nirupama Rao
 Hospet Sumitra
 Sajeeb Wazed
 Mandyam Veerambudi Srinivasan
 Lakshmi Narayanan
 Manouchehr Mottaki
 CNR Rao
 Sargur Srihari
 N. Ahmed
 Geeta Rao Gupta
 Monica Bhide
 Lakshmi Menon
 Pushpamala N.
 Sajjan Jindal
 Sundaraja Sitharama Iyengar
 Anil Kumble
 Rahul Dravid
 Venkatesh Prasad
 Robin Uthappa
 Anaitha Nair
 Anita Pratap
 Indira Jaising
 V. Nagaraja
 Suryanarayanasastry Ramasesha
 Jayaraman Chandrasekhar
 Nagasuma Chandra
 N. Mahesh
 Deepa Sashindran
 B K Thelma

See also 
 List of universities in India
 Universities and colleges in India
 Education in India
 Distance Education Council
 University Grants Commission (India)

References

External links 

 

 
Educational institutions established in 1964
1964 establishments in Mysore State